Villeroy is a commune in the Seine-et-Marne department in the Île-de-France region in north-central France. It is at Villeroy that  the famous French poet Charles Péguy lost his life, the day before the beginning of the Battle of the Marne in the first world war. There is a monument to him there.

See also
Communes of the Seine-et-Marne department

References

External links

1999 Land Use, from IAURIF (Institute for Urban Planning and Development of the Paris-Île-de-France région) 

Communes of Seine-et-Marne